Associazione Calcio Salò was an Italian football club located in Salò, Lombardy. Its colors were white and blue.

In summer 2009 the club merged with A.C. Feralpi Lonato of Lonato del Garda, making as Feralpisalò.

History

The club was founded in summer 1985, as A.C. Salò Benaco and so renamed on 2001, from the merger between two clubs of the city:

 A.C. Salò, founded in 1974 as F.C. Real Plaza Salò and so renamed in 1979, from Prima Categoria
 A.C. Benaco Salò, founded in 1963 as A.C. Benaco, became A.C. Salò in 1969 and so renamed in 1974, from Seconda Categoria.

It played in Serie D winning in 2004 Eccellenza Lombardy and the Coppa Italia Dilettanti, until the merger with A.C. Feralpi Lonato.

Honours
 Coppa Italia Dilettanti
 Winners: 2003–04

References

External links
 Club Site

Defunct football clubs in Italy
Association football clubs established in 1985
Association football clubs disestablished in 2009
Football clubs in Lombardy
1985 establishments in Italy
2009 disestablishments in Italy

nl:AC Salò Valsabbia